Chief of Army Staff or Chief of the Army Staff which is generally abbreviated as COAS is a title commonly used for the appointment held by the most senior staff officer or the chief commander in several nations' armies. 

 Chief of Army (Australia)
 Chief of Army Staff (Bangladesh)
 Chief of Staff of the French Army
 Chief of Army Staff (Ghana)
 Chief of the Army Staff (India)
 Chief of Staff of the Indonesian Army
 Chief of the Army Staff (Italy)
 Chief of the Army Staff (Nepal)
 Chief of Army (New Zealand)
 Chief of Army Staff (Nigeria)
 Chief of Army Staff (Pakistan)
 Chief of Staff of the Army (Spain)
 Chief of Staff of the Republic of Korea Army
 Chief of the Army Staff (Sweden)
 Chief of Staff of the United States Army

See also 
Commander of the Army
Army Staff (disambiguation)
Chief of Staff (military)
Chief of Army (disambiguation)
Chief of the Air Staff (disambiguation)
Chief of the Defence Staff (disambiguation)
Chief of the General Staff
Chief of the Naval Staff (disambiguation)

 

Former disambiguation pages converted to set index articles

it:Capo di Stato Maggiore dell'Esercito